Pseudomonas borbori is an aerobic, Gram-negative, nonfluorescent, nonsporulating, motile, rod-shaped bacterium isolated from a nitrifying inoculum used in aquaculture. Based on 16S rRNA phylogenetic analysis, P. borbori was placed in the P. aeruginosa group.

References

External links
Type strain of Pseudomonas borbori at BacDive -  the Bacterial Diversity Metadatabase

Pseudomonadales
Bacteria described in 2006